Anvar Gafurov (uz: Анвар Ғофуров; born 14 May 1982) is an Uzbekistani professional footballer who currently plays for FC Bunyodkor as a defender.

Career
Anvar Gafurov plays for FC Bunyodkor since 2009 after move from Mash'al Mubarek.

On 26 July 2017, Gafurov re-signed for FC Bunyodkor.

References

External links 

1982 births
Living people
Uzbekistani footballers
FK Dinamo Samarqand players
Association football defenders
Uzbekistan international footballers